Gelena Dmitrievna Topilina (Russian: Гелена Дмитриевна Топилина), born 11 January 1994, is a Russian competitor in synchronized swimming.

She won 3 gold medals at 2015 World Aquatics Championships and a gold medal at the 2014 European Aquatics Championships.

References
Profile

Living people
Russian synchronized swimmers
1994 births
World Aquatics Championships medalists in synchronised swimming
Swimmers from Moscow
Synchronized swimmers at the 2015 World Aquatics Championships
Synchronized swimmers at the 2016 Summer Olympics
Olympic synchronized swimmers of Russia
Olympic gold medalists for Russia
Olympic medalists in synchronized swimming
Medalists at the 2016 Summer Olympics
European Aquatics Championships medalists in synchronised swimming